Mi Mejor Regalo is the nineteenth (19th) studio album by Puerto Rican singer Yolandita Monge and also her first Christmas album released in 1992. The compositions and arrangements are more in the style of villancico.  The album's cover by photographer and stylist Raúl Torres and is a black and white picture, later color painted. This release is available as a digital download at iTunes and Amazon.

Track listing

Credits and personnel

Vocals: Yolandita Monge
Production: Carlos 'Topy' Mamery
Musical Arrangements: Julián Navarro
Mixing: Jan Lucas and Luis G. Pisterman
Vocal Engineer: Víctor (Sonny) Hernández
Vocals Recorded on: Ochoa Recording Studios, Puerto Rico

Photography and Art Concept: Raúl Torres
Color Lab: Creative & Graphic Processes
Graphic Design: Edwin Crespo
Three Kings Postcard: José R. Colón
Hair & Make-up: Raúl Torres

Notes

Track listing and credits from album booklet.
Released in Cassette Format on 1992 (91254-4).
Released digitally by WEA-Latina on November 16, 2010.

References

Yolandita Monge albums
1992 albums